The 1994 Asian Games (Senkyūhyakukyūjūyon-nen Ajia kyōgi taikai), also known as the XII Asiad and the 12th Asian Games, were held from October 2 to 16, 1994, in Hiroshima, Japan. The main theme of this edition was to promote peace and harmony among Asian nations. It was emphasized by the host because the venue was the site of the first atomic bomb attack 49 years earlier. Due to the 1991 Gulf War, Iraq was suspended from the games. The games debuted former republics of the Soviet Union: Kazakhstan, Kyrgyzstan, Tajikistan, Turkmenistan, and Uzbekistan.

There were a total number of 6,828 athletes and officials involved, from 42 countries, with a total number of 34 events. Debut sports at this edition of the Asiad were baseball, karate and modern pentathlon.

Bidding process

In 1983, two cities in Asia demonstrated interest to host the 1990 Asian Games, one was Beijing in the People's Republic of China and the other was Hiroshima in Japan. The two appeared before the Olympic Council of Asia, during a meeting of the same, the following year in Seoul, that also served as a previous meeting to evaluate the preparations of the city for the next Asian Games and also for the 1988 Summer Olympics.  
Beijing eventually won the right to host the 1990 edition, while Hiroshima, when presenting an excellent technical level bid, won as compensation the rights to host the 1994 Games.

34 votes were needed for selection.

Marketing

Logo
The emblem of the games is an abstract image of a dove, symbol of peace, which resembles the letter 'H' initial as in the host city name Hiroshima, reflecting Hiroshima's desire for peace. The OCA emblem is the symbol of Asian Games as a whole which resembles athlete in motion.

Mascot

The official mascot of the XII Asiad is a pair of white doves. Poppo and Cuccu, male and female respectively, represent peace and harmony - the main theme of this edition of the Asian Games. They were designed by well-known manga artist and character designer Susumu Matsushita.

Participating nations
National Olympic Committees (NOCs) are named according to their official IOC designations and arranged according to their official IOC country codes in 1994.

Sports

Calendar

Medal table

The top ten ranked NOCs at these Games are listed below. The host nation, Japan, is highlighted.

Doping scandal
The Chinese had 11 athletes test positive for banned drugs and anabolic steroids at the 1994 Asian Games. Less than a month before the Asian Games scandal at the 1994 world championships in Rome, the Chinese had won 12 of the 16 women's swimming titles, with two of those nine world champions among those who tested positive at the Asian games.

References

External links
 Hiroshima city university Asian Games page

 
A
Asian Games
Asian Games
Asian Games
Multi-sport events in Japan
Asian Games by year
Sports competitions in Hiroshima
Asian